Ani Ghukasyan (born 12 August 1990) is an Armenian footballer who plays as a defender for FC Alashkert and the Armenia women's national team.

See also
List of Armenia women's international footballers

References

External links
http://www.ffa.am/en/2012-2013/group/156

1990 births
Living people
Women's association football defenders
Armenian women's footballers
Armenia women's international footballers
FC Alashkert players
Armenian expatriate footballers
Armenian expatriate sportspeople in Belarus
Expatriate women's footballers in Belarus